Qiao Sen (born 14 May 1990) is a Chinese taekwondo athlete.

He represented China at the 2016 Summer Olympics in Rio de Janeiro, in the men's +80 kg.

References

External links

1990 births
Living people
Chinese male taekwondo practitioners
Olympic taekwondo practitioners of China
Taekwondo practitioners at the 2016 Summer Olympics
Asian Games bronze medalists for China
Asian Games medalists in taekwondo
Taekwondo practitioners at the 2014 Asian Games
Universiade medalists in taekwondo
Medalists at the 2014 Asian Games
Sportspeople from Shijiazhuang
Universiade bronze medalists for China
Medalists at the 2015 Summer Universiade
21st-century Chinese people